Rosa 'Intrigue (aka JACum) is a mauve floribunda rose cultivar, bred by William Warriner, and introduced by Jackson & Perkins into the United States in 1982. The cultivar was named an All-America Rose Selections winner in 1984.

Description
'Intrigue' is a tall, lanky upright shrub, 3 to 5 ft (90–150 cm) in height, with a 2 to 3 ft (60–90 cm) spread. Blooms have an average diameter of 3.5 inches (9 cm). Flowers are purplish-red in color and fade to magenta. Flowers have a strong fragrance, and large double petals (17–25) borne in large clusters of 5 to 15 on long stems. The leaves are medium in size, glossy, and dark green. The plant thrives in USDA zone 6b and warmer.

Awards 
 
 All-America Rose Selections winner, USA, (1984)

See also
Garden roses
Rose Hall of Fame
List of Award of Garden Merit roses

References

Intrigue